Barbara A. Paterson  is a Canadian artist, primarily known for her bronze figurative works, specializing in a variety of sculpture media including wax, stone, bronze and welded steel. She is based in Edmonton and is best known for her public sculptures of the "Famous Five."

Biography 
Paterson was born and raised in Edmonton and is the great-granddaughter of physician, William MacKay. Paterson started studying fine arts in the 1960s at the University of Alberta (U of A), but did not complete her degree. Instead, she met her husband at the university, got married and then worked as a stay-at-home mom. Later, she went back to U of A and earned her bachelor of fine arts in 1988.

Paterson sculpted numerous public commissions, including Lois Hole "A Legacy of Love and Learning", and the  "Famous Five" monuments in Calgary, Alberta's Olympic Square and on Parliament Hill in Ottawa, Ontario. A detail image from the "Famous Five" monuments was featured on a Canada Post stamp in October 1999, and was pictured on the Canadian $50.00 bill. An image of part of the statue can now be seen on the inner pages of the Canadian passport. For the "Famous Five" sculpture, which is titled the Women are Persons! Monument, she first created model sculptures that were later scaled up into life-sized bronze. The sculpture includes an empty chair which the artist added in order to make the sculpture more interactive.

In 2000, Paterson was honored by U of A with a Distinguished Alumni Award.

In 2021, Paterson was named to the Order of Canada for extraordinary contributions.

Works

References

External links 

 Featured Artist interview

Canadian sculptors
Artists from Edmonton
Living people
Canadian women artists
University of Alberta alumni
Members of the Order of Canada
Members of the Royal Canadian Academy of Arts
1935 births